Whisenhunt is a surname. Notable people with the surname include:

 Corey Whisenhunt (born 1988), American soccer player
 Ken Whisenhunt (born 1962), American football coach

See also
 Thomas Whisenhant (1947–2010), American serial killer